Elizabeth Joan Gibbons  (1902-2 December 1988) was a British botanist.

Biography
Gibbon was born in Essex but her family moved to Holton le Moor (Lincolnshire)) in 1907. Through her father, Rev. Thomas Gibbons, she attended meetings of the Lincolnshire Naturalists' Union as a child and joined as a member  when she was 18.  She became the Botanical Secretary of the LNU in 1936, a position she held for more than 50 years, and served as the Union's President for the first time in 1939.  

In 1946 she joined the Botanical Society of Britain and Ireland and became the vice-county recorder for the two Lincolnshire Vice-counties (VC 53 and 54). She was an avid field-worker and contributed a large number of records to the dataset for Lincolnshire; her contributions were consolidated in her 1975 publication The Flora of Lincolnshire. In her fieldwork she also worked with John H. Chandler. Her collected herbarium was donated to the Natural History Museum.

Gibbons was elected as a Fellow of the Linnean Society in 1969. She was also a member of the Society for Lincolnshire History and Archaeology.

Publications
Collins, E.J. 1975. The Flora of Lincolnshire.
Collins, E.J. and Weston, I. 1985. Supplement to The Flora of Lincolnshire. Lincolnshire Naturalists' Union.

References

1902 births
1988 deaths
British botanists
People from Essex
Fellows of the Linnean Society of London
Members of the Lincolnshire Naturalists' Union
People from West Lindsey District